Ghana Economic Forum (GEF) is a two-day forum focused on discussions pertaining to issues around the Ghanaian economy. The forum which started about 6 years ago (2012) is organised by the Business & Financial Times and was endorsed in 2017 by the government of Ghana as part of Ghana’s 60th Independence celebrations.

Annual Meeting 
The forum has been organised annually since 2017, and is organised at a different location each year. The themes of the conference also varies annually and are carved to reflect the current economic trends of the country.

List of notable speakers 
 Yaw Osafo-Marfo (Senior Minister, Ghana)
 Kwesi Amissah-Arthur (Former Vice President, Ghana)
 Mahamudu Bawumia (Vice President, Ghana)

References 

Financial services in Ghana